The 2022–23 snooker season is a professional snooker season with tournaments played between June 2022 and May 2023.

Players 
The World Snooker Tour in the 2022–23 season initially consisted of a field of 131 professional players, but later dropped to 130 when Igor Figueiredo did not renew his WPBSA membership and fell off tour. The top 64 players from the prize money rankings after the 2022 World Championship, and 30 players earning a two-year card the previous year automatically qualify for the season. The other 36 tour cards are given to the following groups. Four places are allocated to the top four on the One Year Ranking List who have not already qualified for the Main Tour. Nine players from international championships and two players from the Q Tour are offered the tour cards. One player comes from the CBSA China Tour and two players from World Women's Snooker. 12 places are available through the Q School (four Event 1 winners, four Event 2 winners, and four Event 3 winners). Four places are offered  to the new Asia-Oceania Q School (two Event 1 winners and two Event 2 winners). The last two tour cards are invitational tour cards, given to Stephen Hendry and Ken Doherty.

As one of the winners from the inaugural Q School Asia & Oceania – Event 1 qualification event, former professional player Thanawat Thirapongpaiboon was eligible to receive a fresh two-year tour card. However, on 22 June 2022, the WPBSA and the World Snooker Tour declined to offer him a tour card, citing "serious disciplinary matters from when Thanawat was previously a professional player in 2015" as the reason. His place was therefore offered to Asjad Iqbal, who was the next in line on the Asia-Oceania Q School Order of Merit.

New professional players 
All players listed below received a tour card for two seasons.

Top 4 players from 2021/2022 One Year Ranking List

International Champions

Q Tour

CBSA China Tour

World Women's Snooker Qualifiers

Invitational Tour Card

Q School
Event 1

Event 2

Event 3

Q School Asia & Oceania
Event 1

Event 2

Order of Merit

Calendar

World Snooker Tour
The following tables outline the dates and results for all the events of the World Snooker Tour and World Women's Snooker. The calendar is subject to change, due to the continuing impact of the global COVID-19 pandemic.

The following events were scheduled but were later cancelled:

World Women's Snooker

World Seniors Tour

Q-Tour

Other events

World ranking points

Notes

References

External links 
 Calendar 2022/2023 at snooker.org

Seasons in snooker
Season 2022
Season 2023